The 2017–18 Abilene Christian Wildcats women's basketball team represented Abilene Christian University during the 2017–18 NCAA Division I women's basketball season. The Wildcats, led by sixth year head coach Julie Goodenough, played their home games at the Moody Coliseum. They finished the season 16–14, 9–9 in Southland play to finish in seventh place. They advanced to the quarterfinals of the Southland women's tournament where they lost to Central Arkansas.

Previous season
The Wildcats finished the 2016–17 season 23–9 overall and 16–2 in conference play.  They shared the  Southland Conference Regular Season championship with Central Arkansas.  The Wildcats, in their fourth and final year of transition from NCAA Division I to NCAA Division II, were ineligible to participate in the Southland Conference tournament and the NCAA Division I Women's Tournament.  They were selected to participate in the WNIT winning against Oklahoma State and losing to SMU.

Roster
Sources:

Schedule
Sources:

|-
!colspan=9 style=";"| Non-conference regular season

|-
!colspan=9 style=";"| Southland regular season

|-
!colspan=9 style=";"| Southland Women's Tournament

See also
2017–18 Abilene Christian Wildcats men's basketball team

References

Abilene Christian Wildcats women's basketball seasons
Abilene Christian
Abilene Christian
Abilene Christian